"Numb Little Bug" is a song by American singer-songwriter Em Beihold, released as her major-label debut single on January 28, 2022, through Republic Records and Moon Projects, as the second single from her second EP, Egg in the Backseat. It was written by Beihold with Nick Lopez and Dru DeCaro, and produced by DeCaro, Elijah Hill and Dallas Caton. The song went viral on TikTok in early 2022, where it had been used in more than 60,000 videos by late February 2022.

Background and release
Beihold wrote the song about being "numb" while on antidepressants due to her anxiety, saying they "sucked the soul and energy" out of her. She shared a section of the song on TikTok in mid-2021, after which she signed with Moon Projects and released the song through Republic Records. A press release called the song a "pensive and powerful pop anthem" with "airy piano" and "bouncy verses".

Music video
The song's animated lyric video was released alongside the song on January 28, 2022. The song's official music video was released on March 10, 2022.

Charts

Weekly charts

Year-end charts

Certifications

References

2022 singles
2022 songs
Em Beihold songs
Republic Records singles
Songs about anxiety
Songs written by Em Beihold